Gordon Bruce may refer to:
Gordon Bruce (politician) (1930–1995), South Australian politician
Gordie Bruce (1919–1997), Canadian ice hockey player